Peineta is a studio album by Los Tres.

Track listing
 "País de Ilusión"
 "Jazz Huachaca"
 "El Organillero"
 "Bailando en Cochanli"
 "Lala"
 "Una Perra con un Perro"
 "El Chute Alberto"
 "Cerro Caracol"
 "Las Negritas"
 "Lagrimas Negras"

Los Tres albums
1998 live albums